The 13th World Para Archery Championships took place in Dubai, United Arab Emirates from 19 to 27 February 2022. Originally the event was to take place in 2021 but it was delayed until 2022 by COVID-19 pandemic. It was the first time the switch to a two-archer doubles format rather than three-archer teams for the single-gender competitions. Athletes from China were unable to travel due to ongoing pandemic restrictions. This was the biggest parasport event in Dubai since the city hosted the World Para Athletics Championships in 2019.

Schedule 
Source:

Medalists

Participants 
A total of 212 archers from the national teams of the following 40 countries was registered to compete at 2022 World Para Archery Championship.

 (1)
 (1)
 (7)
 (1)
 (2)
 (6)
 (3)
 (1)
 (1)
 (5)
 (6)
 (2)
 (5)
 (12)
 (1)
 (1)
 (9)
 (9)
 (4)
 (1)
 (16)
 (7)
 (10)
 (8)
 (1)
 (1)
 (4)
 (1)
 (3)
 (5)
Russian Archery Federation (16)
 (5)
 (1)
 (1)
 (4)
 (11)
 (15)
 (3)
 (10)
 (12)

Medals table

References

External links 
 Complete Book

World Para Archery Championships
World Para Archery Championships
World championships in archery
International sports competitions hosted by the United Arab Emirates
Sports competitions in Dubai
Sports events postponed due to the COVID-19 pandemic